Clarence Henry "Du" Burns (September 13, 1918 – January 12, 2003) was a Democratic politician and the first African American mayor of Baltimore, Maryland in 1987.

Early life 
Burns was born in Baltimore on September 13, 1918. One of his first jobs was locker room attendant at Dunbar High School, one of the others being picking up newspapers. He got the nickname "Du" for what he would "do" for his community.

Career
Du Burns was first elected to the Baltimore City Council in 1971. He was later elected City Council President in 1983, defeating Mary Pat Clarke in the election. In January 1987, the then-Mayor William Donald Schaefer resigned after being elected Governor of Maryland. As City Council president, Burns was elevated to mayor, becoming the first black mayor in the city's history.

In the 1987 city elections, Burns ran for a full term but was defeated in the Democratic primary by Kurt Schmoke. He ran again in 1991, once more falling second to Schmoke for the primary.

In 1991, a new arena on the waterfront near the neighborhood of Canton and Chestertown was named in Burns' honor. In 2014, the field received a renovation deal of 20 years, worth up to $1.5 million.

Personal life 
Burns was Catholic, an active member of Historic St. Francis Xavier Church.

References

External links

 

1918 births
2003 deaths
United States Army soldiers
United States Army personnel of World War II
Baltimore City Council members
Mayors of Baltimore
African-American mayors in Maryland
Maryland Democrats
20th-century American politicians
African-American city council members in Maryland
African-American Catholics
20th-century African-American politicians
African-American men in politics
21st-century African-American people